Kang Gee-Eun (also Gang Ji-Eun, ; born October 15, 1990 in Seoul) is a South Korean sport shooter. She beat World Cup champion Yang Huan of China and two-time Olympian Yukie Nakayama of Japan for the gold medal in the women's trap at the 2012 Asian Shooting Championships in Doha, Qatar, accumulating a score of 93 clay pigeons. Kang is also a member of Korea Telecom Shooting Team, and is coached and trained by Song Nam-Jun.

Kang represented South Korea at the 2012 Summer Olympics in London, where she competed in the women's trap. Kang scored a total of 62 targets in the qualifying rounds by one point ahead of India's Shagun Chowdhary, finishing only in nineteenth place.

References

External links
NBC Olympics Profile

1990 births
Living people
South Korean female sport shooters
Trap and double trap shooters
Olympic shooters of South Korea
Shooters at the 2012 Summer Olympics
Sport shooters from Seoul
Asian Games medalists in shooting
Shooters at the 2010 Asian Games
Shooters at the 2014 Asian Games
Shooters at the 2018 Asian Games
Universiade medalists in shooting
Asian Games silver medalists for South Korea
Asian Games bronze medalists for South Korea
Medalists at the 2010 Asian Games
Medalists at the 2018 Asian Games
Universiade bronze medalists for South Korea
20th-century South Korean women
21st-century South Korean women